
New Zealand Food Safety (NZFS), or Haumaru Kai Aotearoa, is the New Zealand government body responsible for food safety, and is the controlling authority for imports and exports of food and food-related products. In April 2012 it was merged into the Ministry for Primary Industries.

The NZFSA administered legislation covering:

 food for sale in New Zealand
 primary processing of animal products and official assurances related to their export
 exports of plant products and the controls surrounding registration, and
 use of agricultural compounds and veterinary medicines.

In July 2007 the NZFSA was separated from the Ministry of Agriculture and Forestry to form a new Public Service Department. On 1 July 2010, the New Zealand Food Safety Authority (NZFSA) was amalgamated back into the Ministry of Agriculture and Forestry.

Food Bill 160-2
Food Bill 160-2 was introduced on 26 May 2010 to make some fundamental changes to New Zealand's domestic food regulatory regime. Significantly, for an export-led economic recovery for New Zealand, the domestic food regulatory regime is the platform for exports. The New Zealand domestic standard is used as the basis for negotiating equivalence arrangements with trading partners. This minimizes the excessive importing country requirements that may be imposed but which do not go to food safety. If passed into law and fully implemented, it would replace the Food Act 1981 and the Food Hygiene Regulations 1974. Food Bill will also make consequential amendments to the Animal Products Act 1999 and the Wine Act 2003 to improve the interface of regulatory processes across food sectors.

MAF (through NZFSA) managed New Zealand's participation in Codex Alimentarius and set strategic priorities which ensure that Codex standards have the widest possible application.

See also
 Food safety in New Zealand
 Food Standards Australia New Zealand
 Food Act 1981 - New Zealand

References

External links
New Zealand Food Safety Authority

Government agencies of New Zealand
Regulators of biotechnology products
Food safety organizations
Food safety in New Zealand
Medical and health organisations based in New Zealand
Regulation in New Zealand